Post Mortem is a 2020 Hungarian horror film directed by Péter Bergendy. It was selected as the Hungarian entry for the Best International Feature Film at the 94th Academy Awards.

Plot

In 1918, towards the end of the First World War, on a battlefield, the German soldier Thomas is left for dead after an artillery explosion, being thrown into the mass grave; however, an older soldier sees him still breathing in the pile of corpses and pulls him out of a flooded trench, where in a semi-conscious state due to the explosion, he had a strange vision: that of a girl who calls him back to life. Six months later, now a very peculiar photographer, by offering bereaved relatives the possibility of having a last permanent memory of their dead, composing family photos in which the living and the dead (made up and recomposed) pose together, Tomás sees how his hallucination seems to materialise in the enigmatic person of Anna, an orphan girl of about ten years of age.

Tomás is temporarily separated from the travelling caravan of which he is a member, to go to Anna's Hungarian village, at the invitation of some of its inhabitants. It turns out that in that village and others around it, the frozen ground prevents the burial of the many victims of a dreadful pandemic. The photographer sets to work, taken in by the local teacher Marcsa, but the atmosphere is very heavy and paranoid in such terrible times when, according to the locals, "there are more dead than alive, and the land is overrun by ghosts".

Tomás and Anna decide to continue their investigations on the frontier of the beyond, but events worsen and the dangers become greater and greater... barking dogs, muffled moans coming from nowhere, evil shadows, oozing walls, invisible attacks, duplicities, discreet or large-scale attacks, stratagems to witness the presence of ghosts (ropes, bells, flour on the ground, traces of torches, photographic plate and phonograph, etc.).

Cast
 Viktor Klem as Tomás
 Fruzsina Hais as Anna
 Judit Schell as Marcsa
 Andrea Ladányi as Auntie
 Zsolt Anger as Imre

See also
 List of submissions to the 94th Academy Awards for Best International Feature Film
 List of Hungarian submissions for the Academy Award for Best International Feature Film

References

External links
 

2020 films
2020 horror films
Hungarian horror films
2020s Hungarian-language films

Spanish flu in popular culture
Films about influenza outbreaks
Hungarian World War I films